La Plaza may refer to;

United States
 LA Plaza de Cultura y Artes, a Mexican-American museum in Los Angeles, California
 La Plaza (Palm Springs), an open-air shopping center in Palm Springs, California
 La Plaza Cultural de Armando Perez, a community garden and green space in New York, New York
 La Plaza Mall, a regional shopping mall in McAllen, Texas

Other countries
 The Opera House (Toronto) or La Plaza Theatre, a music venue in Ontario, Canada
 La Plaza, Pichilemu, a village in  Cardenal Caro Province, Chile
 La Plaza, a parish in Teverga, Spain
 La Plaza de Paraguachí, a town on Isla Margarita, in Nueva Esparta, Venezuela

See also
 The Plaza (disambiguation)
 Plaza (disambiguation)
 Plaza Theatre (disambiguation)